Valery Semyonovich Kleymyonov (born 10 September 1965) is a Russian football coach and a former player. He works as a goalkeeping coach for Pari NN.

International career
Kleymyonov played two games for CIS, making his debut on January 29, 1992 in a friendly against El Salvador.

Honours

Player
FC Dynamo Moscow
Russian Cup: 1995

Shanghai Shenhua
Chinese FA Cup: 1998

References

External links
  Profile

1965 births
People from Tula Oblast
Living people
Soviet footballers
Soviet Union international footballers
Russian footballers
FC Rotor Volgograd players
FC Dynamo Moscow players
Russian Premier League players
Maccabi Herzliya F.C. players
Expatriate footballers in Israel
Shanghai Shenhua F.C. players
FC Saturn Ramenskoye players
FC Shinnik Yaroslavl players
FC Khimki players
Russian expatriate footballers
Expatriate footballers in China
Russian expatriate sportspeople in China
FC Arsenal Tula players
Association football goalkeepers
FC Iskra Smolensk players
Sportspeople from Tula Oblast